The 2013–14 Winnipeg Jets season was the 15th season for the National Hockey League franchise and the third in Winnipeg. The franchise played in Atlanta since the 1999–2000 NHL season, and relocated to Winnipeg following the conclusion of the 2010–11 NHL season.

Regular season 
The Jets relieved Head Coach Claude Noel of coaching duties on January 12, 2014, and replaced him with Paul Maurice. At the time of the coaching change, the Jets were out of the playoff picture holding a 19–23–5 record. The Jets won their first four games and went 8–2–0 in their first ten games with Maurice, climbing back into the Western Conference playoff hunt.

Standings

Schedule and results

Pre-season

Regular season

Player statistics
Final Stats 

Skaters

Goaltenders

†Denotes player spent time with another team before joining the Jets.  Stats reflect time with the Jets only.
‡Traded mid-season. Stats reflect time with the Jets only.
Bold/italics denotes franchise record

Transactions 
Winnipeg has been involved in the following transactions during the 2013–14 season.

Trades

Free agents signed

Free agents lost

Claimed via waivers

Lost via waivers

Lost via retirement

Player signings

Draft picks

Winnipeg Jets' picks at the 2013 NHL Entry Draft, which was held in Newark, New Jersey on June 30, 2013.

Draft notes

 The Winnipeg Jets were awarded a compensatory pick on September 20, 2012 for failure to sign 2008 first-round pick, Daultan Leveille.
 The Chicago Blackhawks' second-round pick went to the Washington Capitals as the result of a trade on June 30, 2013 that sent Washington's third and fourth-round picks in 2013 (84th and 114th overall) and Calgary's fifth-round pick in 2013 (127th overall) to Winnipeg in exchange for this pick.     Winnipeg previously acquired this pick as the result of a trade on June 30, 2013 that sent Johnny Oduya to Chicago in exchange for Chicago's third-round pick in 2013 and this pick.
 The Winnipeg Jets' third-round pick went to the Chicago Blackhawks as the result of a trade on June 30, 2013 that sent Michael Frolik to Winnipeg in exchange for a fifth-round pick in 2013 (134th overall) and this pick.
 The Washington Capitals' third-round pick went to the Winnipeg Jets as the result of a trade on June 30, 2013 that sent Chicago's second-round pick in 2013 (61st overall) to Washington in exchange for a fourth-round pick in 2013 (114th overall), Calgary's fifth-round pick in 2013 (127th overall) and this pick.
 The Chicago Blackhawks' third-round pick went to the Winnipeg Jets as a result of a February 27, 2012 trade that sent Johnny Oduya to the Blackhawks in exchange for a 2013 second-round pick and this pick.
 The Washington Capitals' fourth-round pick went to the Winnipeg Jets as the result of a trade on June 30, 2013 that sent Chicago's second-round pick in 2013 (61st overall) to Washington in exchange for a third-round pick in 2013 (84th overall), Calgary's fifth-round pick in 2013 (127th overall) and this pick.
 The Calgary Flames' fifth-round pick went to the Winnipeg Jets as the result of a trade on June 30, 2013 that sent Chicago's second-round pick in 2013 (61st overall) to Washington in exchange for a third and fourth-round pick in 2013 (84th and 114th overall) and this pick.     Washington previously acquired this pick as the result of a trade on June 27, 2012 that sent Dennis Wideman to Calgary in exchange for Jordan Henry and this pick.
The Winnipeg Jets' fifth-round pick went to the Chicago Blackhawks as the result of a trade on June 30, 2013 that sent Michael Frolik to Winnipeg in exchange for a third-round pick in 2013 (74th overall) and this pick.
 The New Jersey Devils' seventh-round pick went to the Winnipeg Jets as a result of a February 13, 2013 trade that sent Alexei Ponikarovsky to the Devils in exchange for a 2014 fourth-round pick and this pick.
 The Winnipeg Jets' sixth-round pick went to the Pittsburgh Penguins as the result of a trade on February 13, 2013 that sent Eric Tangradi to Winnipeg in exchange for this pick (being conditional at the time of the trade). The condition – Pittsburgh will receive a sixth-round pick in 2013 if Tangradi plays a certain number of games for Winnipeg – the date of conversion in unknown.

References

Winnipeg Jets seasons
Winnipeg Jets season, 2013-14
Winn